Nanomia is a genus of cnidarians belonging to the family Agalmatidae.

The genus has almost cosmopolitan distribution.

Species:

Nanomia bijuga 
Nanomia cara

References

Agalmatidae
Hydrozoan genera